is a passenger railway station in located in Nishi-ku, Sakai, Osaka Prefecture, Japan, operated by West Japan Railway Company (JR West).

Lines
It is also the terminus of the Hagoromo Line, a 1.7 kilometer spur line to

Station layout
The station consists of one side platform and two island platforms connected by an elevated station building. The station has a Midori no Madoguchi staffed ticket office.

Platforms

Adjacent stations

|-
!colspan=5|JR West

History
Ōtori Station opened on 18 July 1929. With the privatization of the Japan National Railways (JNR) on 1 April 1987, the station came under the aegis of the West Japan Railway Company.

Station numbering was introduced in March 2018 with Ōtori being assigned station number JR-R33.

Passenger statistics
In fiscal 2019, the station was used by an average of 19,096 passengers daily (boarding passengers only).

Surrounding area
 Sakai City Nishi Ward Office
Osaka Health and Welfare Junior College (Otori Campus)
Osaka Prefectural Sakai High School
Yashima Gakuen High School
Yamashima Gakuen College of Technology

See also
List of railway stations in Japan

References

External links

 Ōtori Station information 

Railway stations in Osaka Prefecture
Railway stations in Japan opened in 1929
Sakai, Osaka